This is a list of diseases starting with the letter "T".

T–Tc
 Tachycardia
 Taeniasis
 Takayasu arteritis
 Talipes equinovarus
 Tamari–Goodman syndrome
 Tang Hsi Ryu syndrome
 Tangier disease
 TAR syndrome
 Tardive dyskinesia
 Tarsal tunnel syndrome
 Taste disorder
 TAU syndrome
 Taurodontia absent teeth sparse hair
 Taurodontism
 Tay syndrome ichthyosis
 Taybi–Linder syndrome
 Taybi syndrome
 Tay–Sachs disease
 T-cell lymphoma

Te

Tee–Ten
 Teebi–Kaurah syndrome
 Teebi–Naguib–Alawadi syndrome
 Teebi–Shaltout syndrome
 Teebi syndrome
 Teeth noneruption of with maxillary hypoplasia and genu valgum
 Tel Hashomer camptodactyly syndrome
 Telangiectasia ataxia variant V1
 Telangiectasia, hereditary hemorrhagic
 Telangiectasia
 Telecanthus hypertelorism pes cavus
 Telecanthus with associated abnormalities
 Telencephalic leukoencephalopathy
 Telfer–Sugar–Jaeger syndrome
 Temporal epilepsy, familial
 Temporomandibular ankylosis
 Temporomandibular joint dysfunction (TMJ)
 Temtamy–Shalash syndrome
 TEN

Ter–Tet
 Ter Haar–Hamel–Hendricks syndrome
 Ter Haar syndrome
 Teratocarcinosarcoma
 Teratoma
 Testes neoplasm
 Testotoxicosis
 Tetanus
 Tethered spinal cord disease
 Tetraamelia ectodermal dysplasia
 Tetraamelia multiple malformations
 Tetraamelia pulmonary hypoplasia
 Tetraamelia-syrinx
 Tetrahydrobiopterin deficiency
 Tetraploidy
 Tetrasomy 9p
 Tetrasomy 15qter syndrome 
 Tetrasomy X

Th

Tha–Thi
 Thakker–Donnai syndrome
 Thalamic degeneration symmetrical infantile
 Thalamic degenerescence infantile
 Thalamic syndrome
 Thalassemia major
 Thalassemia minor
 Thalassemia
 Thanatophobia
 Thanatophoric dysplasia cloverleaf skull
 Thanatophoric dysplasia Glasgow variant
 Thanos–Stewart–Zonana syndrome
 Theodor–Hertz–Goodman syndrome
 Thiele syndrome
 Thiemann epiphyseal disease
 Thies–Reis syndrome
 Thin ribs tubular bones dysmorphism
 Thiolase deficiency
 Thiopurine S methyltranferase deficiency

Tho
 Thomas–Jewett–Raines syndrome
 Thomas syndrome
 Thombocytopenia X linked
 Thompson–Baraitser syndrome
 Thong–Douglas–Ferrante syndrome
 Thoracic celosomia
 Thoracic dysplasia-hydrocephalus syndrome
 Thoracic outlet syndrome
 Thoraco abdominal enteric duplication
 Thoraco limb dysplasia Rivera type
 Thoracolaryngopelvic dysplasia
 Thoracopelvic dysostosis
 Thost–Unna palmoplantar keratoderma

Thr–Thu
 Thrombasthenia
 Thrombocytopathy asplenia miosis
 Thrombocytopathy
 Thrombocytopenia cerebellar hypoplasia short stature
 Thrombocytopenia chromosome breakage
 Thrombocytopenia multiple congenital anomaly
 Thrombocytopenia purpura
 Thrombocytopenia Robin sequence
 Thrombocytopenia
 Thrombocytopenic purpura, autoimmune
 Thrombocytosis
 Thrombomodulin anomalies, familial
 Thrombotic microangiopathy, familial
 Thrush
 Thumb absence hypoplastic halluces
 Thumb absent short stature immune deficiency
 Thumb deformity, alopecia, pigmentation anomaly
 Thumb deformity
 Thumb stiff brachydactyly mental retardation

Thy
 Thymic carcinoma
 Thymic epithelial tumor
 Thymic renal anal lung dysplasia
 Thymoma
 Thymus neoplasm
 Thyrocerebrorenal syndrome
 Thyroglossal tract cyst
 Thyroid agenesis
 Thyroid cancer
 Thyroid carcinoma, follicular
 Thyroid carcinoma, papillary (TPC)
 Thyroid hormone plasma membrane transport defect
 Thyroid, renal and digital anomalies

Ti–Tn
 Tibia absent polydactyly arachnoid cyst
 Tibiae bowed radial anomalies osteopenia fracture
 Tibial aplasia ectrodactyly hydrocephalus
 Tibial aplasia ectrodactyly
 Tibial hemimelia cleft lip palate
 Tick paralysis
 Tick-borne encephalitis
 Tièche–Jadassohn nevus
 Tietz syndrome
 Tinnitus
 T-Lymphocytopenia
 TNF receptor associated periodic syndrome (TRAPS)

To

Tod–Tot
 Todd's paralysis
 Todd's syndrome
 Togaviridae disease
 Tollner–Horst–Manzke syndrome
 Tolosa–Hunt syndrome
 Toluene antenatal infection
 Tomaculous neuropathy
 Tome–Brune–Fardeau syndrome
 Tongue neoplasm
 Toni–Debre–Fanconi maladie
 Toni–Fanconi syndrome
 TORCH syndrome
 Toriello–Carey syndrome
 Toriello–Lacassie–Droste syndrome
 Toriello syndrome
 Toriello–Higgins–Miller syndrome
 Torres–Ayber syndrome
 Torsades de pointes
 Torsion dystonia 7
 Torticollis
 Torticollis keloids cryptorchidism renal dysplasia
 Torulopsis
 Tosti–Misciali–Barbareschi syndrome
 Total hypotrichosis, Mari type

Tou–Tox
 Touraine–Solente–Golé syndrome
 Tourette syndrome
 Townes–Brocks syndrome
 Toxic conjunctivitis
 Toxic shock syndrome
 Toxocariasis
 Toxopachyoteose diaphysaire tibio peroniere
 Toxoplasmosis
 Toxoplasmosis, congenital

Tr

Tra
 Tracheal agenesis
 Tracheobronchomalacia
 Tracheobronchomegaly
 Tracheobronchopathia osteoplastica
 Tracheoesophageal fistula symphalangism
 Tracheoesophageal fistula
 Tracheophageal fistula hypospadias
 Trachoma
 Tranebjaerg–Svejgaard syndrome
 Transcobalamin II deficiency
 Transient erythroblastopenia of childhood
 Transient global amnesia
 Transient neonatal arthrogryposis
 Transitional cell carcinoma
 Transplacental infections
 Transposition of great vessels
 Transverse limb deficiency hemangioma
 Transverse myelitis
 TRAPS

Tre
 Treacher Collins syndrome
 Treft–Sanborn–Carey syndrome
 Tremor hereditary essential
 Treponema infection
 Trevor disease

Tri

Tria
 Triatrial heart

Tric
 Trichinellosis
 Trichinosis
 Tricho–dento–osseous syndrome type 1
 Tricho odonto onycho dermal syndrome
 Tricho odonto onychodysplasia syndactyly dominant type
 Tricho onychic dysplasia
 Tricho onycho hypohidrotic dysplasia
 Tricho retino dento digital syndrome
 Trichodental syndrome
 Tricho–dento–osseous syndrome
 Trichodermodysplasia dental alterations
 Trichodysplasia xeroderma
 Trichoepithelioma multiple familial
 Trichofolliculloma
 Tricho-hepato-enteric syndrome
 Trichomalacia
 Trichomegaly cataract hereditary spherocytosis
 Trichomegaly retina pigmentary degeneration dwarfi
 Trichomoniasis
 Trichoodontoonychial dysplasia
 Trichorhinophalangeal syndrome type I
 Trichorhinophalangeal syndrome type II
 Trichorhinophalangeal syndrome type III
 Trichostasis spinulosa
 Trichothiodystrophy sun sensitivity
 Trichothiodystrophy
 Trichotillomania
 Tricuspid atresia
 Tricuspid dysplasia
 Tricyclic antidepressant overdose

Trig–Trip
 Trigeminal neuralgia
 Trigger finger
 Trigonocephaly
 Trigonocephaly bifid nose acral anomalies
 Trigonocephaly broad thumbs
 Trigonocephaly ptosis coloboma
 Trigonocephaly ptosis mental retardation
 Trigonomacrocephaly tibial defect polydactyly
 Trihydroxycholestanoylcoa oxidase isolated deficiency
 Trimethadione antenatal infection
 Trimethylaminuria
 Triopia
 Triosephosphate isomerase deficiency
 Triphalangeal thumb non opposable
 Triphalangeal thumb polysyndactyly syndrome
 Triphalangeal thumbs brachyectrodactyly
 Triple A syndrome
 Triplo X Syndrome
 Triploid Syndrome
 Triploidy

Tris
 Trismus pseudocamptodactyly syndrome
 Trisomy 1 mosaicism
 Trisomy 11 mosaicism
 Trisomy 12 mosaicism
 Trisomy 14 mosaicism
 Trisomy 2 mosaicism
 Trisomy 3 mosaicism
 Trisomy 6
 Trisomy

Tro–Try
 Trochlear dysplasia
 Trophoblastic Neoplasms (gestational trophoblastic disease)
 Trophoblastic tumor
 Tropical spastic paraparesis
 Tropical sprue
 Troyer syndrome
 Trueb–Burg–Bottani syndrome
 Trypanophobia
 Trypanosomiasis, East African
 Trypanosomiasis, West African

Ts
 Tsao–Ellingson syndrome
 Tsukahara–Azuno–Kajii syndrome
 Tsukahara–Kajii syndrome
 Tsukuhara syndrome

Tu–Tw
 Tuberculosis, pulmonary
 Tuberculosis
 Tuberculous meningitis
 Tuberculous uveitis
 Tuberous Sclerosis
 Tuberous Sclerosis, type 1
 Tuberous Sclerosis, type 2
 Tucker syndrome
 Tuffli–Laxova syndrome
 Tufted angioma
 Tularemia
 Tungiasis
 Tunglang–Savage–Bellman syndrome
 Turcot syndrome
 Turner–Kieser syndrome
 Turner–Morgani–Albright
 Turner-like syndrome
 Turner's syndrome
 Tutuncuoglu syndrome
 Twin-to-twin transfusion syndrome

Ty–Tz
 Typhoid
 Typhus
 Tyrosinemia
 Tyrosine-oxidase temporary deficiency

T